Clive Edward Hazzard Strutt (born 19 April 1942) is an English composer. He was born in Aldershot, Hampshire, England, and he was educated at Farnborough Grammar School.

Strutt lives on the island of South Ronaldsay in Orkney, Scotland. He studied composition under Lennox Berkeley, orchestration under Leighton Lucas, and piano with Robert O. Edwards, Georgina Smith, and Hamish Milne at the Royal Academy of Music, London. He also studied the viola for one year under Watson Forbes. He is very interested in the music of the Eastern Orthodox Church, and has visited Mount Athos several times. He is also a philatelist, and an authority on the Universal Postal Union.

Strutt's works have been performed in France, Germany, Norway, Russia, Serbia, Switzerland, as well as in the UK, Ireland, Canada and the USA. A large number of his scores are available from the Scottish Music Centre (SMC), Glasgow, the Bibliothèque Božidar Kantušer, Paris and more recent ones from Amoris International & Amoris Imprint, Vouvry, Switzerland. In addition, many of Strutt's scores are available for viewing and/or downloading at the San Francisco-based digital library Internet Archive, the IMSLP (Petrucci Music Library) headquartered in Canada and the Kreuzlingen (Switzerland) based MusicaNeo global online platform.

Symphonies 
The Symphony No. 1 in E minor (a student work composed during 1962–63 whilst Strutt was at the Royal Academy of Music, London) was submitted for the Division V Composition Examination in 1964 and was awarded the Manson Bequest for Composition. A four-movement large-scale piece for large orchestra (including 2 basset horns, piano, organ, 8 French horns, 4 trumpets, and a large body of strings), and lasting one hour, it is dedicated to the memory of the great Victorian engineer Isambard Kingdom Brunel, whose achievements had impressed the composer and were a source of inspiration to him.

The money from the Manson Bequest enabled the composer to spend the summer in the Highlands of Scotland at Loch Kishorn, in Wester Ross, where he was able to make good headway on the composition of the symphony No. 2 in C minor, also in four movements. Scored for an orchestra of more conventional size this work plays for some 57 minutes, and includes a chorus singing wordlessly in the second movement, and, in the finale, singing a text of one line only, taken from Virgil's epic, the Aeneid, Sunt lacrimae rerum, et mentem mortalia tangunt ("These are the tears of things which pierce the universal heart"). The second movement is based on the Romanesca bass as a passacaglia theme, and the following slow movement attempts to reflect an experience which the composer had during a highland holiday. One evening while staying at the Carbisdale Castle youth hostel on the Firth of Sutherland he walked up the hill behind the castle and was deeply impressed by the total and absolute silence: no sound of human voices, or bird calls, no mechanical noise, and not even the sound of the wind. Paradoxically, then, the music attempts to convey the impression of silence. The original part for organ in the score was minimal, and was removed in 1991 on the revision of the symphony. The score was taken on a visit that Strutt made to the home of the composer Havergal Brian in Shoreham-by-Sea, and was read through by Brian for his approval as the dedicatee. This happened a couple of years before Brian's death in the 1970s.

With his Symphony No.3 in E-flat major subtitled "Visions of Albion" Strutt moved into the world of William Blake, and expanded his own symphonic ambitions even further. In seven movements for large orchestra (including quadruple woodwind, a quartet of saxophones, 6 horns, 5 trumpets, harpsichord, two mandolins, two harps, organ, as well as a tenor soloist, a boys' two-part choir and a double mixed chorus), and lasting 75 minutes, this work clearly betrays the influence of Mahler.The inspirational origin of the work lay, however, in the simple act of walking along a very rocky and boulder-strewn shore at Loch Kishorn during his stay there in 1964, and observing the dense texture of rocks and vegetation which translated itself into a similar musical texture forming part of the first movement entitled "Vision of Nature". Most of the movements are prefaced with quotations from William Blake, in this case "All things begin and end in Albion's Ancient Druid Rocky Shore" from his prophetic poem Jerusalem:The Emanation of the Great Albion. Movement II "Camelot" bears the quotation "Great Things are done when Men and Mountains meet;/This is not done by Jostling in the Street". Movements III and IV are both songs. III "The Schoolboy", and IV "The Garden of Love" are settings of Blake poems, the first for boys'choir, and the second for tenor solo.Movement V "The Holy Oblation" has prominent parts for harpsichord and trumpets, and is prefaced with the Blake quotation "What is Grand is necessarily obscure to Weak men. That which can be Explicit to the Idiot is not worth my care". The sixth movement "Avalon", another reference to the Arthurian legends, is the real slow movement; its prefatory quotation is "We impose on one another, and it is but lost time to converse with you whose words are only Analytics".The Finale "The New Jerusalem" is prefaced "Without Contraries is no progression", alluding to the use by the composer of a structural device known as progressive tonality. The movement is structured around the augmented fourth interval between A minor and E-flat major. The text used is the one immortalized by Sir Hubert Parry in his setting of it called "Jerusalem", but in this symphony it is used in a fugal manner, with unaccompanied boys' voices in a fugal exposition heralding the final peroration. The composer dedicated this work to his parents, Edward and Stella Strutt, as a mark of respect and recognition for the role they played in providing him with material support for his musical activities.

The score was completed on 1 August 1967 at Park Croft Cottage, Rackwick, on Hoy, Orkney, and the first movement having been completed on 4 June 1966 at Shirva Hut on Fair Isle, Shetland. The title of the first movement and the Blake quotations (Movements II-VII) were all part of the original conception, but the titles of movements II, V, VI, and VII were added in 1979 after the composer had read Geoffrey Ashe's book on King Arthur's Camelot. The subtitle of the entire work "Visions of Albion" was also added at that time.

With the Symphony No. 4, Kenosis, completed in 1986, Strutt moved right away from tonality as a source of structural method, and the composition consequently exhibits a high degree of atonality. This one movement symphony, lasting 20 minutes, features a large array of percussion instruments (marimba, bass marimba, vibraphone, xylophone, crotales, tubular bells, Swiss cowbells, tuned gongs, glockenspiel, tamtam, side-drum, suspended cymbal, wood-block, clash cymbals, bass drum, tambourine, wind machine and güiro) set in a normal sized orchestra (triple woodwind, etc.). In fact, 78 players are required in all, including four percussionists. The "Kenosis" subtitle refers to a theological concept which centres on the emptying of the self, such as Jesus Christ is considered to have done.

The Symphony No.5 in D major was written before No. 4, but was numbered after it since the composer conceived the fourth first. The dedication is to Edward Winston Watson, and was added to the score on 8 November 1980 as a token of esteem and friendship, and in recognition of his provision of support during the composition of the work, which took place at the Villa Clos Collonges in Territet, Montreux, in Switzerland in 1973. The work is in three movements, and the underlying structural concept is a transition from serialism returning to tonality in the finale, this tracing an emotional journey from relative chaos and turmoil into restful tranquility. It is scored for a large orchestra of 99 players and lasts 24 minutes.

Strutt's Symphony No.6 in E-flat minor "Eclogues from a Vanished Land" plays for just 40 minutes and is intended to evoke the lost world of Edwardian rural England, especially the countryside which would have been known to the folk-song collectors, Cecil Sharp, Ralph Vaughan Williams and Percy Grainger. The Vanished land is of course England, but that particular England. The first of the three movements is entitled "ROUNDELAY:'Under the Greenwood Tree...'". Prefaced by the literary quotation "...and this prayer I make, / Knowing that Nature never did betray / The heart that loved her,..." (lines 121–123 from Wordsworth's "Tintern Abbey"), this movement is obviously from its title intended to evoke the world of Thomas Hardy. A curious point regarding this first movement is that the conductor, the late Vernon Handley, rejected it for performance on the grounds that there was just one bar for the second violin in the first movement which was too difficult to play!

The second movement "TRIPTYCH:'The Mirror of Venus' (after Sir Edward Burne-Jones)' is in three sections: (i) ELEGY, (ii) SCHERZO (founded on the English folk tune "Staines Morris"), and (iii) "The Metamorphosis of Narcissus" (after Salvador Dalí). "Staines Morris" is the only actual folk tune used in the work. The title of the "TRIPTYCH" provides a clue to the structure of the movement, in that Burne-Jones' painting shows a group of Pre-Raphaelite maidens gazing at their own reflections in a pool of water. The three sections form a musical palindrome – the music of the "Metamorphosis of Narcissus" (also a painting showing a youth gazing at his reflection in a pool) is the reverse of the "ELEGY", and hence the "SCHERZO", where the forward-moving music starts to reverse.

The third movement, "FINALE.Three Worlds" (after M.C. Escher and with a title also referring to a visual work depicting reflections in water) is also subdivided into three sections: (i) PROLOGUE "A Future IN MEMORIAM"; PERPETUUM MOBILE: and EPILOGUE "In a Country Churchyard" (which is referring to the famous poem by Thomas Gray evoking yet again the idea of "eclogues from a vanished land" which pervades the whole composition).

Symphony No.7 in G minor ("Athonite") lasts for one hour, and is in three movements: I "Pilgrimage", II "Ek Batheon" (the Greek, Έκ βαθέον, meaning "from the depths", or in Latin, "de Profundis") and III FINALE "The Garden of the Panaghia", referring to the Greek Orthodox monastic idea that the peninsula Mount Athos (Άγιον Όρος, Agion Oros) forms a garden for the all-holy one, the Theotokos, or Mother-of-God. Strutt being a member of the society The Friends of Mount Athos (FoMA) has made many visits to Mount Athos, finding it a holy place of inspiration. The symphony was conceived in the early 1990s, but not scored until 2003. "Pilgrimage", the title of the first movement, simply represents the feelings of a visiting pilgrim to the Holy Mountain. "Ek Batheon" however is a much more profound study of the torments of the soul experienced by the solitary hesychast, or hermit, living in utter and total simplicity and wrestling with temptation, arrested by the attempts of the devil to conquer him. In this movement the orchestra is divided into two parts, and the musical events portray a terrifying state of mind. The last movement includes a boys' and men's chorus who sing six of the Orthodox Apolytikia of the Resurrection, and is an attempt to portray the beauty and peace of the Holy Mountain as it appears to an outside visitor.

The Symphony No. 8 ("Orkney Choral Symphony") sees the composer back on home ground – Orkney – where he has lived since 1970. More of a song cycle, the seven movements are settings of Orcadian poetry. The movements are: I-PROLOGUE:"Orkney Summer"(SONNET I), the text by Robert Rendall;II SONG 1: "Cataface" (the Scots for the short-eared owl), to text by Harriet Campbell; III-LAMENT:"The Brig o' Waithe", the text by Ann Scott-Moncrieff describing the civilian casualty in World War II Britain when a German aircraft returning to base after attempting to attack Scapa Flow randomly released its bombs over Orkney; IV-SONG 2 "Sleep! Baby, sleep!", the text by James Morrison; V-INTERMEZZO "Merlin" (SONNET II), the text by Edwin Muir; VI-PANEGYRIC "For Ann Scott-Moncrieff (1914–43)", the text by Edwin Muir and VII-EPILOGUE "The Peace of Orkney", the text by John Skea. The total duration of the composition is just under 25 minutes and the score was completed in 1999.

Strutt's Symphony No. 9 in D minor ("The Fountain of Tears") was completed in 2004. It is a two-part symphonic study of the Spanish poet Federico García Lorca. Part I comprises nine settings of his poetry, for soprano and baritone soli, and SATB choir, and orchestra. Part II, entitled "Ainadamar (18/ix/1936)", (the name and date of the place where Lorca's execution took place), is purely orchestral and can be considered to be a symphonic poem on the life and death of the poet. In part I the poems set are I "Ballad of the Little Square", II "Hunter", III "Little Balade of the Three Rivers", IV "Song" (to Claudia Gillen), V "Village", VI "Song", VII "Song of the Rider" (1860), VIII "CASIDA of the Rose",and IX "The Lament". This symphony may also be considered a quasi concerto in that there is a prominent part for the acoustic Spanish guitar. The title of the composition, "Fountain of Tears" is the actual meaning of Ainadamar (Arabic, Ayn al-Dam).

Overtures

The Concert Overture "William Cobbett" was created by making a transcription for orchestra of the Rondo for oboe and piano in 1962, the bicentenary year of Cobbett's birth (9 March 1762) at Farnham in Surrey, close to where the composer was born and grew up. Cobbett was a local figure with whose attitudes to life the composer was sympathetic. The overture received a rehearsal performance by the BBC Northern Ireland Light Orchestra in Belfast in 1969, under the auspices of the BBC's light music rehearsal scheme. The conductor was Havelock Nelson and the producer was Alan Tongue. It was on this occasion that Strutt first met and became acquainted with Derek Bell, the harpist in the orchestra, who became a lifelong friend and exponent of Strutt's works.

In 1973 another transcript was made, for small orchestra, of a single movement originally written for string quartet, under the title King Richard II. At the head of the score of this concert overture appears a quotation from Shakespeare, generally known as John of Gaunt's speech. The quartet dated originally from 1962 and 1966. The orchestral scoring is for double woodwind, two trumpets and two horns, timpani, three percussionists, celesta and strings, and the duration is six minutes.

In 1987 a concert overture entitled Céilidh (a Scottish Gaelic word denoting a dance-cum-social gathering) appeared, this also being a transcription but this time from an original piece for clarinet quartet. The work is entirely based on Scottish dance tunes, namely the slow march John Bain McKenzie's March (also known as The Fairy Piper, the Strathspey Dainty Davie, and the Reels Maxwell's Rant and The Fairy Dance. The scoring is for double wind and brass (without tuba), timpani, percussion and strings, the only exception being that the clarinet section is expanded to four players, and includes bass, alto and piccolo clarinets. The premiere was given on 30 November 1996 (St. Andrew's Day) at the Nicolson Square Methodist Church Edinburgh by the New Edinburgh Orchestra under the American conductor Daniel G. Monek, with Lucy Creanor as leader. Another public performance was given on 1 December 1999 at Adelaide's, Bath Street, Glasgow by the Glasgow Symphony Orchestra conducted by Tommy Fowler.

Symphonic poems

In 1973, the year before the centenary of the birth of Gustav Holst, a composer much admired by Strutt, inspired the production of a symphonic poem entitled Pluto, the Bringer of Change. This was intended as both a tribute to the memory of Holst and a commemoration of his birth, and the intention in performance terms was as a work to be played in the same programme as Holst's Planets suite – the orchestration is the same, except that no vocal forces are used. The compositional history of the piece is, however, not of a work originally composed for orchestra, but of a work transcribed for orchestra from a chamber piece for seven clarinets. This clarinet septet – the scoring included the rare octocontrabass and contrabass clarinets, as well as the E-flat piccolo and alto clarinets – was played in a private run-through at Kneller Hall (the Royal Military School of Music) by an ad hoc ensemble led by Terry Busby in 1969, but subsequently ceased to have a separate existence once the orchestral transcription had been made.

The symphonic poem At the Tomb of the Sea-Eagles was composed in 1986. The composer was living in a cottage in the South Parish of South Ronaldsay, and only a couple of fields away from a now prominent archaeological site known as the Tomb of the Eagles. This is a Neolithic chambered tomb discovered in 1958 by Ronald Simison, the farmer on whose land the tomb lies, and later professionally excavated and written-up by John W. Hedges. Hedges occupied a cottage in the locality and became friendly with Strutt. The symphonic poem is dedicated to Hedges, and the score bears a quotation from the latter's popular publication "Tomb of the Eagles": "When in Orkney I sometimes walk down to the tomb of Isbister to spend time on my own. It is a place of great atmosphere where, cut off from the outside world, one is inescapably made aware of the past. I am not talking of psychic phenomena here but, more mundanely, of the sheer impressiveness of a prehistoric monument and the insight which modern archaeology can give us into the period in which it was built. One can almost bring it to life in the imagination and even in its present state of decay it provides considerable reflection. Perhaps one day it will be the source of inspiration for a piece of music – the thought itself is an indication of my feelings".

The work lasts thirteen minutes in performance, and the scoring is for a triple woodwind-sized orchestra including a cimbalom, piano doubling celesta, organ and SATB chorus. The sung text comprises the sacred incantatory mystical syllable "Om" characteristic of Indian religions, and is used in the context of the score both as a quasi-instrumental element, and a reference to link the practice of sky burial, which is believed to have been used at the tomb, with Tibet where excarnation is also to be found.

String quartets

Strutt's String Quartet No. 1 has a long history. Originating in 1959 as a pre-student work, its two movements constituted the only remaining sections of a much longer piece of which the rest was destroyed. The two movements – "Lament", and "Scherzo" – were premiered at the Farnham Festival, Surrey, England on 12 May 1960 in St Andrew's Parish Church, Farnham, and were repeated on the next day at the Aldershot Festival, the performers being Jenifer Springate and Gillian Feltham (violins), Helen Johnstone (viola) and Dietrich Küchemann (cello). A minor revision of the score was carried out in 2003, followed four years later by a substantial revision which saw the composition expanded to four movements: I "Prologue" (being the original "Lament" of the 1960 version); II "Variations on J.S.Bach's Chorale Harmonisation of "Valet will ich dir geben" by Melchior Teschner (c. 1615); III "Scherzo and trio" (substantially as in the original version) and, IV "Epilogue" (a re-working of the material from the first movement).

The String Quartet No. 2 similarly has had a long history of revision. Originally composed in 1963 it was revised in 1991 for submission to the Third Concurso de Composición Musical ("Luis de Narváez"), in 1992 in Granada, Spain. The work is in four movements: Prologue; Scherzo; Adagio ; Finale.

The composition of String Quartet No.3 (from "The Frieze of Life" of Edvard Munch) was prompted by the Oslo Grieg Society's Fourth International Edvard Grieg Memorial Competition characterised as "The Music in Edvard Munch's Paintings". Its three movements are intended to portray musical interpretations of three of Munch's paintings: I The Dance of Life; II Melancholy; III The Scream.

Compositions

 1964 Symphony No. 1 in E minor
 1965 Symphony No. 2 in C minor (revised 1991)
 1967 Symphony No. 3 in E-flat major, "Visions of Albion"
 1986 Symphony No. 4, "Kenosis"
 1973 Symphony No. 5 in D major
 1987 Symphony No. 6 in E-flat minor, "Eclogues from a Vanished Land"
 2003 Symphony No. 7 in G minor, "Athonite"
 1999 Symphony No. 8, "Orkney Choral Symphony"
 2004 Symphony No. 9, in D minor, "The Fountain of Tears"
 1968–2016 Madrigals, twelve books including to texts by Oscar Wilde, Lord Alfred Douglas and Alfred Noyes
 1962 William Cobbett, a concert overture
 1973 King Richard II, a concert overture
 1987 Céilidh, a concert overture based on Scottish dance tunes
 1973 Pluto, the Bringer of Change, a symphonic poem
 1973 36 Variations and Fugue on a theme of Ralph Vaughan Williams, for pianoforte
 1986 At the Tomb of the Sea-Eagles, a symphonic poem
 1980 Tyneham, an elegy for string orchestra]
 1982 Saint Magnus Mass
 1983 Lines, Circles, Scenes, Letters, Characters, a symphonic fantasy
 1985 The Tragedy of Man, an existentialist opera in four acts. Libretto by the composer based on the play Az ember tragédiája by Imre Madách
 1985 Festal Eucharist in honour of Saint Olaf, King and Martyr
 1996 Praeludium and Trisagion
 1997 Sinfonia Concertante: Remininscences of Troldhaugen - A Symphonic Metamorphosis of Edvard Hagerup Grieg's sketch fragments for an unrealised Piano Concerto No. 2 in B minor.
 2009 Piano Concerto
 1963 Soliloquy for viola solo
 1983 Hibernian Rhapsody
 2008 Song cycle Athos Ethos 
 2007 Japanese Sketches:Book IV, "Autumn Haiku"
 2011 Opus Alchymicum, sonata for oboe and pianoforte
 2011 All-Night Vigil
 1973 Fantasy: "Strange Philosophy", for solo cimbalom and orchestra
 2009 Orkney Songbook
 2003 Northumbrian Folk-tune Suite for flute and piano
 1996 Song Cycle "The Unknown Goddess" for mezzo-soprano and piano, to poems by Humbert Wolfe
 2013 Ouroboros for Saxophone Sextet
 2015 Armenian Paternoster (Hayr mer)
 2015 Loss and Bereavement: A choral song cycle to poems of Robert Burns
 2015 In War-time: A choral song cycle of war poetry
 2015 Albatross Songs for tenor voice, violin, oboe d'amore (or clarinet in A) and guitar
 2017 Cantata da Chiesa Gebet des Heiligen Bruder Klaus
 2018 Voces Christianae
 2019 Impressions from Mount Athos for violin, French horn and piano
 2019 Skaldic Verses for tenor solo, French horn and pipe organ. Text in Old Norse
 2020 Tower of the Yellow Crane: Fourteen Songs of Stillness for the Eight Taoist Immortals - to texts in English translated by John Blofeld

References

External links

Clive Strutt entry at Scottish Music Centre
Amoris International
Kantuser – BIMC
Internet Archive

1942 births
Living people
20th-century classical composers
Alumni of the Royal Academy of Music
English classical composers
Musicians from Aldershot
English male classical composers
20th-century English composers
20th-century British male musicians